Secret Nuclear Bunker may refer to:
 Hack Green Secret Nuclear Bunker, a former government nuclear bunker in Cheshire, England
 Kelvedon Hatch Secret Nuclear Bunker, a former government nuclear bunker in Essex, England